Luke Puskedra (born February 8, 1990) is an American long-distance runner who competes over distances ranging from 10,000 meters to the marathon.

He grew up in Ogden, Utah and attended Judge Memorial Catholic High School before studying business administration at the University of Oregon. He competed for the Oregon Ducks track and field and cross country teams, earned 12 NCAA Division I All-American awards and was a 10,000 meter finalist at the NCAA level four years running from 2009 to 2012.

In 2015 Puskedra won the Vancouver Sun Run.

Running career

High school
Puskedra graduated from Judge Memorial Catholic High School in Salt Lake City, Utah in 2008. He was an eight-time state champion in high school winning Utah state track championships in the 1600 meters and 3200 meters as a sophomore, junior and senior and winning the state cross country championships as a junior and senior. He set all-classifications records his senior year in track at 3200 meters (8:54.40) and 1,600 meters (4:09.40) and cross country (14:54.60). He was also the first Utah high school runner to break 9:00 in the 3200 meters. He was the 2007 Nike Cross Southwest Regional champion winning the race in 14:48 breaking the meet record. He went on to place fifth at the 2007 Foot Locker National Cross Country Championships. He ran the fastest high school indoor mile time in the country (4:08.77) in 2008 at the Reebok Boston Indoor Games. On March 16, 2008, at the Nike Indoor Nationals Puskedra ran the sixth fastest high school indoor two mile time in U.S. history winning the race in a time of  8:49.58. In 2008 as a senior he placed second in both the mile (4:06.60) and two mile (8:47.06) at the Nike Outdoor National meet. He placed tenth in the two mile at the 2008 Prefontaine Classic in a time of 8:46.41. As a junior he finished fourth in the Penn Relays high school boys mile in 4:25.11. Puskedra was a three-time Utah Boys Gatorade Athlete of the Year recipient (2006–07 and 2007–08 in track and 2007 in cross country). He was the 2007-08 Salt Lake Tribune Athlete of Year (all sports) and a USA Today All-American at one and two miles.

High school bests:
800 m - 1:58.37
Mile - 4:06.60
1600 m - 4:09.29
Two mile - 8:46.41
3200 m - 8:54.40

Collegiate
Puskedra was recruited to University of Oregon where coach Andy Powell had him specialize in various long distances spanning from the 3 km to 10 km. He placed fourth overall in the men's 10,000 meter final at the 2012 NCAA DI Outdoor T&F Championships.

Post-collegiate
After graduating from Oregon, Puskedra signed a professional contract with Nike and joined the Nike Oregon Project. There he was coached by Alberto Salazar, and the training regimen was very similar to the college program as Salazar was largely influential in Powell's training philosophy at the University of Oregon.

However, at the end of 2014, his contract with Nike expired, and Puskedra did not anticipate continuing a professional career in running. He moved with his wife to South Africa and gained 23 pounds from his race weight in the course of a month. In spite of the time elapsed from his graduation, college coach Andy Powell remained in contact with Puskedra and gradually convinced him to return to running.

Puskedra and his wife returned to the United States, where he trained briefly for a marathon debut at the 2014 New York City Marathon. In his marathon debut, he ran 2:28:54, but given his half marathon personal record it was widely seen as a disappointing result. Although discouraged by his experience in New York City, he proceeded to train for the 2015 Grandma's Marathon, where he ran a significantly faster result of 2:15:27.

After 2016 US Olympic Marathon Trials, Puskedra switched from Nike to ASICS following Team Hall's apparels unification. But he later reverted to Nike, due to connect with Evan Jager and Sam Crouser.

In January 2018, Luke Puskedra joined the Oregon Track Club.

Shortly after the 2019 Aramco Houston Half marathon, Luke Puskedra's Oregon Track Club contract becomes expired. Soon, Luke Puskedra retired from competitive running and turn into real estate. For 2019 season, Luke Puskedra won't run at the 2019 Faxon Law New Haven Road Race 20k. Instead, Jim Walmsley will run the 2019 Faxon Law New Haven Road Race 20k.

Competition record

Marathon

Half marathon

USA National Championships

Road

Track and field

NCAA championships

Outdoor track and field

Indoor track and field

Cross country

Personal bests

References

External links 
 
 
 Luke Puskedra University of Oregon Ducks profile
 Luke Puskedra Joins the Nike Oregon Project

Living people
1990 births
Track and field athletes from Salt Lake City
American male long-distance runners
American male marathon runners
Oregon Ducks men's track and field athletes
Oregon Ducks men's cross country runners